Henriette Agnete Kitty "Hedda" von Kaulbach (1900-1992) was a German–Dutch painter.

Biography 
Von Kaulbach was born on 6 February 1900 in Munich. She was the daughter of the musician Frida Scotta and the artist Friedrich August von Kaulbach. She attended the Akademie der Bildenden Künste (München) (Academy of Fine Arts, Munich). She was married for a time to the German sculptor  (1888-1982). From the late 1920s to the mid 1940s she lived in Amsterdam. Von Kaulbach's work was included in the 1939 exhibition and sale Onze Kunst van Heden (Our Art of Today) at the Rijksmuseum in Amsterdam. Von Kaulbach died in 1992.

References

1900 births
1992 deaths
Artists from Munich
20th-century Dutch women artists
20th-century German women artists
German emigrants to the Netherlands
von Kaulbach family